Blossia is a genus of daesiid camel spiders, first described by Eugène Simon in 1880.

Species 
, the World Solifugae Catalog accepts the following fifty-nine species:

 Blossia aegyptica (Roewer, 1933) — Egypt, Israel
 Blossia albocaudata Levy & Shulov, 1964 — Israel
 Blossia alticursor Lawrence, 1929 — South Africa
 Blossia anatolica (Roewer, 1941) — Turkey
 Blossia angolensis (Lawrence, 1960) — Angola
 Blossia arabica (Roewer, 1933) — Yemen
 Blossia brincki (Lawrence, 1955) — South Africa
 Blossia clunigera Kraepelin, 1908 — Namibia, South Africa
 Blossia costata (Roewer, 1933) — Namibia
 Blossia crepidulifera Purcell, 1902 — South Africa
 Blossia ebneri (Roewer, 1933) — Israel, Morocco
 Blossia echinata Purcell, 1903 — South Africa
 Blossia electa Roewer, 1933 — Morocco
 Blossia falcifera Kraepelin, 1908 — Namibia, South Africa, Zimbabwe
 Blossia filicornis Hewitt, 1914 — Namibia
 Blossia fimbriata Kraepelin, 1914 — Namibia
 Blossia fradei (Lawrence, 1960) — Angola
 Blossia gaerdesi (Lawrence, 1972) — Namibia
 Blossia gluvioides (Roewer, 1933) — Mauritania
 Blossia grandicornis Lawrence, 1929 — South Africa
 Blossia hessei Lawrence, 1929 — South Africa
 Blossia homodonta (Lawrence, 1972) — Namibia
 Blossia karrooica Purcell, 1902 — South Africa
 Blossia laminicornis Hewitt, 1919 — South Africa
 Blossia lapidicola (Lawrence, 1935) — South Africa
 Blossia laticosta Hewitt, 1919 — Somalia?, Israel, South Africa
 Blossia litoralis Purcell, 1903 — South Africa
 Blossia longipalpis (Lawrence, 1935) — Angola, Namibia
 Blossia macilenta (Lawrence, 1968) — South Africa
 Blossia maraisi Hewitt, 1915 — South Africa
 Blossia maroccana (Roewer, 1933) — Morocco
 Blossia massaica Roewer, 1933 — Tanzania
 Blossia namaquensis Purcell, 1902 — Namibia, South Africa
 Blossia nigripalpis (Roewer, 1933) — Israel, Somalia
 Blossia obscura Kraepelin, 1908 — Botswana
 Blossia obsti (Roewer, 1933) — Tanzania
 Blossia occidentalis (Roewer, 1933) — Israel, Morocco, Western Sahara
 Blossia omeri (Levy & Shulov, 1964) — Israel
 Blossia orangica (Lawrence, 1935) — South Africa
 Blossia pallideflava (Lawrence, 1972) — South Africa
 Blossia parva (Roewer, 1933) — Namibia, South Africa
 Blossia planicursor Wharton, 1981 — Namibia
 Blossia pringlei (Lamoral, 1974) — South Africa
 Blossia purpurea Wharton, 1981 — Namibia
 Blossia quadripilosa (Lawrence, 1960) — Angola
 Blossia robusta (Lawrence, 1972) — Namibia
 Blossia rooica Wharton, 1981 — Namibia
 Blossia rosea (Lawrence, 1935) — South Africa
 Blossia sabulosa (Lawrence, 1972) — Namibia
 Blossia scapicornis (Lawrence, 1972) — South Africa
 Blossia schulzei (Lawrence, 1972) — Namibia
 Blossia setifera Pocock, 1900 — Zimbabwe
 Blossia singularis (Lawrence, 1965) — South Africa
 Blossia spinicornis Lawrence, 1928 — Namibia
 Blossia spinosa Simon, 1880 — Algeria, Egypt, Israel, Morocco, Sudan, Tunisia
 Blossia sulcichelis (Roewer, 1941) — Tanzania
 Blossia toschii (Caporiacco, 1949) — Kenya
 Blossia tricolor Hewitt, 1914 — Namibia
 Blossia unguicornis Purcell, 1902 — South Africa

References 

Arachnid genera
Solifugae